Rodger Dean Duncan (born in Oklahoma City, Oklahoma) is an American author and business consultant whose focus is leadership, human performance, and the strategic management of change.

Consulting
After working at F.I. duPont, Glore Forgan & Co., the Wall Street operations of Texas businessman H. Ross Perot, Duncan started his consulting career in 1972.  His first client was the Executive Office of the President of the United States.  He served as communication counsel to cabinet officers in two White House administrations.  He later served in a similar capacity for Republican U.S. Senators Richard Lugar, Orrin Hatch, and Howard Baker.

In 1976, Duncan was named Outstanding Young Man of America by the U.S. Jaycees.

One of Duncan's early corporate clients was Campbell Soup Company, which in 1978 hired him to run its worldwide communication operations.

Since the early 1980s, Duncan's consulting work has focused on leadership development, organizational culture, human performance, and change management issues.  His private sector clients have included IBM, American Airlines, Eli Lilly and Company, Consolidated Edison of New York, Hallmark Cards, Sprint, Black & Veatch, eBay, Texas Instruments, and many others.  In the public sector, Duncan has served the Nuclear Regulatory Commission, Tennessee Valley Authority, Bonneville Power Administration, the Federal Reserve Bank, and the United States Army.

Education
Duncan holds a Bachelor of Arts degree from Baylor University where he studied American literature and psychology.  At Baylor he was active in student government, president of his senior class, president of Sigma Tau Delta literary society, and an honor student.

He earned a Master of Arts in communications degree at Brigham Young University, where he also served on the faculty in the Communications Department and was managing director of University Publications.

Duncan earned a Ph.D. in organizational communication at Purdue University. He also served on the Purdue faculty, teaching both undergraduate and graduate courses.

Early career
While an undergraduate at Baylor University, Duncan started a career in journalism as a staff writer for The Waco Tribune-Herald.  He had never taken a course in journalism, but the editors of the local newspaper gave him a chance.  Duncan later served as religion editor of The Salt Lake Tribune.

In early 1968 Duncan joined the reporting staff at The Fort Worth Star-Telegram where he covered business and politics.  His coverage of the Texas gubernatorial campaign that year, as well as his reporting on the national presidential campaign, attracted the attention of Jim Lehrer (now of television fame on the PBS NewsHour) who was a young editor at The Dallas Times Herald.  Lehrer persuaded Duncan to move to Dallas where he continued to cover politics but also served as an investigative reporter.  As a young journalist, Duncan interviewed people from a range of backgrounds, including U.S. president Lyndon Johnson, comedian Jack Benny, Baroness Maria von Trapp, cardiac surgery pioneer Michael DeBakey, historian Arnold Toynbee, pollster George Gallup, artist Norman Rockwell, and anthropologist Margaret Mead.

Duncan's reporting earned awards from the American Bar Association and the Associated Press.  At the age of 24, he was hired as editor of both The Texarkana Gazette and The Texarkana Daily News.  One of the reporters he hired to work with him in Texarkana was Stanley R. Tiner, who later would lead The Sun Herald newspaper in Biloxi-Gulfport, Mississippi, to the Pulitzer Prize.

Writing 
In addition to his editing and reporting, in his early career Duncan was a freelance writer. His articles appeared in a range of newspapers including The Christian Science Monitor, The New York Times, The National Observer, and The Denver Post. He also wrote for several magazines such as Parade, Family Weekly, Boys' Life, Writers Digest, and The Saturday Evening Post.

While a young journalist, Duncan wrote “Tongue in Cheek,” a column that was syndicated nationally to small and medium-sized newspapers.  Today Duncan writes an Internet column titled “The Duncan Report,” which focuses on leadership and performance improvement issues. The column reaches opt-in business subscribers in more than 130 countries.

In 2002 Duncan and co-author Ed J. Pinegar, published Leadership for Saints, a book focused on principles and skills for Church lay leaders, but also applicable for a wider audience.

In 2012 he published Change-friendly Leadership: How to Transform Good Intentions Into Great Performance. The book quickly became an international bestseller and won several awards. Duncan is also a frequent contributor to Fast Company and Forbes magazines.''

Family
Duncan is the second of four children of Marion Claude Duncan and Helen Colleen Stone Duncan, and descended from the family of George Rogers Clark, a prominent American military officer during the American Revolutionary War.   His older brother is Stephen M. Duncan, who served as Assistant Secretary of Defense under U.S. Presidents Ronald Reagan and George H. W. Bush and is a recognized expert on national security issues.

Duncan lives with his wife Rean Robbins in their family home just outside Kansas City, Missouri.  They are parents of four grown children, and have 12 grandchildren.

References

External links
 Duncan Worldwide

Living people
1944 births
Latter Day Saints from Oklahoma
Baylor University alumni
Brigham Young University alumni
Purdue University alumni
Latter Day Saints from Texas
Latter Day Saints from Missouri
Latter Day Saints from Indiana